The Roman Catholic Diocese of Taungngu (Lat: Diocesis Tunguensis) is a diocese of the Latin Church of the Roman Catholic Church in Taungoo, Myanmar. The current bishop is Isaac Danu, appointed in 1989.

History
Erected in 1870, the diocese has the distinction of being one of the oldest in all of Burma. Originally established as the Apostolic Vicariate of Eastern Burma, in 1927 the Vicariate was subdivided, and the Apostolic Prefecture of Kentung established. The Prefecture would eventually become the Diocese of Kengtung. At the same time, the old Vicariate was renamed the Apostolic Vicariate of Toungoo.

In 1955, the Vicariate was elevated to a full diocese. In 1961, the diocese would be again subdivided, and the diocese of Taunggyi, the future Archdiocese of Taunggyi established.

Finally in 1996, the diocese was renamed to the diocese of Taungngu. The diocese is currently suffragan to the Archdiocese of Taunggyi.

Ordinaries
Tancredi Conti (12 February 1882 Appointed - ) 
Rocco Tornatore (18 November 1889 Appointed - 1908 Died)
Vittorio Emanuele Sagrada (10 May 1908 Appointed - 1936 Retired)
Alfredo Lanfranconi (1 July 1937 Appointed - 26 November 1959 Died)
Sebastian U Shwe Yauk (21 March 1961 Appointed - 13 July 1988 Died) 
Isaac Danu (1 Sep 1989 Appointed - )

See also
Catholic Church in Burma

References

Taungngu
Taungngu
Taungngu